Neato is a genus of Australian araneomorph spiders in the family Trachycosmidae, and was first described by Norman I. Platnick in 2002.

Species
 it contains seven species:
Neato arid Platnick, 2002 – Australia (Western Australia)
Neato barrine Platnick, 2002 – Australia (Queensland)
Neato beerwah Platnick, 2002 – Australia (Queensland, New South Wales)
Neato kioloa Platnick, 2002 – Australia (New South Wales, Victoria)
Neato palms Platnick, 2002 – Australia (New South Wales)
Neato raveni Platnick, 2002 – Australia (Queensland)
Neato walli Platnick, 2002 (type) – Australia (Queensland, New South Wales, Victoria)

References

Araneomorphae genera
Gallieniellidae